Mika Baur (born 9 July 2004) is a German professional footballer who plays as a midfielder for SC Freiburg II.

International career
Baur has represented Germany at youth international level.

Personal life
Baur is the son of the German handball player Markus Baur.

Career statistics

Club

References

2004 births
Living people
German footballers
Footballers from Baden-Württemberg
Association football midfielders
Germany youth international footballers
3. Liga players
SC Freiburg players
SC Freiburg II players
People from Bodenseekreis
Sportspeople from Tübingen (region)
21st-century German people